Schinia intermontana is a moth of the family Noctuidae. It is found from British Columbia south to Montana, Washington and Colorado.

It was formerly considered a subspecies of Schinia villosa.

The larvae feed on Erigeron species.

Schinia
Moths of North America
Moths described in 1958